Girish Rajsoni was the 2015 winner of the Shilp Guru award for thewa and gold filigree on glass.  He is from Pratapgarh, Rajasthan, India.

The Government of India has issued a postal stamp featuring an awe-inspiring piece of thewa on a plate, made by Girish Rajsoni in 2002.

Achievements
 UNESCO Seal of Excellence  
 National Award in 1999
 State Award

References

External links 
 
 

Year of birth missing (living people)
Living people
People from Pratapgarh district, Rajasthan
Indian goldsmiths